White County Airport  is a public use airport in White County, Indiana, United States. It is owned by the White County Board of Aviation Commissioners and located three nautical miles (6 km) south of the central business district of Monticello, Indiana. This airport is included in the National Plan of Integrated Airport Systems for 2011–2015, which categorized it as a general aviation facility.

Although many U.S. airports use the same three-letter location identifier for the FAA and IATA, this airport is assigned MCX by the FAA but has no designation from the IATA (which assigned MCX to Uytash Airport in Makhachkala, Russia).

Facilities and aircraft 
White County Airport covers an area of 51 acres (21 ha) at an elevation of 676 feet (206 m) above mean sea level. It has one runway designated 18/36 with an asphalt surface measuring 4,002 by 75 feet (1,220 x 23 m).

For the 12-month period ending December 31, 2011, the airport had 15,180 aircraft operations, an average of 41 per day: 87% general aviation and 13% air taxi. At that time there were 22 aircraft based at this airport: 77% single-engine, 9% multi-engine, 9% glider, and 5% helicopter.

References

External links 
 Townsend Aviation, the fixed-base operator (FBO)
 
 Aerial image as of March 1999 from USGS The National Map
 
 

Airports in Indiana
Transportation in White County, Indiana